14 and 15 King Street is the address of an historic warehouse building in King Street, Bristol, England. It was built around 1860 and is now occupied by a restaurant and offices.

The contemporary 32 King Street is of similar design. It has been designated by English Heritage as a grade IV listed building.

See also 
 Grade II listed buildings in Bristol

References 

Grade II listed buildings in Bristol